William J. Phillipps (1893–1967) was a New Zealand ichthyologist.

He was in 1923 resident naturalist and ethnologist at the Dominion Museum of Wellington.

Bibliography
William J. Phillipps with Gilbert Percy Whitley (1939) Descriptive notes on some New Zealand fishes Transactions of the Royal Society of New Zealand, 69: 228-236.  
Phillipps, W.J. (1932) Notes on new fishes from New Zealand. New Zealand journal of science and technology 13: 226–234

See also
:Category:Taxa named by William John Phillipps

References

New Zealand ichthyologists
Scientific illustrators
1893 births
1967 deaths
20th-century New Zealand zoologists